The Neva Bay, also known as the Gulf of Kronstadt, is the easternmost part of the Gulf of Finland between Kotlin Island and the Neva River estuary where Saint Petersburg city centre is located. The entire bay has been separated from the Gulf of Finland by the 25 km long Saint Petersburg Dam. The entire coastline is designated part of St. Petersburg rather than of Leningrad Oblast.

The bay is also informally known as "the Marquis' Puddle" after Jean Baptiste, marquis de Traversay, the Russian naval minister who regarded the shallow waters of the bay as an ideal place for holding naval exercises. The Saint Petersburg Dam separates the bay from the Baltic Sea.

Bay
Bays of the Baltic Sea
Bays of Russia
Bodies of water of Saint Petersburg